Anna Thörnqvist (born 1 March 1995) is a Swedish footballer. She last played as a midfielder for FC Rosengård in the Damallsvenskan.

Club career
She played for FC Rosengård from 2011 to 2014, winning a Damallsvenskan titles in 2013 and a Super Cup in 2012.

Honours

Club
FC Rosengård
Winner
 Damallsvenskan: 2013
 Super Cup: 2012

Runner-up
 Damallsvenskan: 2012

External links
 
 
 
 Anna Thörnqvist at Soccerdonna.de 
 Anna Thörnqvist at Fussballtransfers.com 
 

1995 births
Living people
Swedish women's footballers
FC Rosengård players
Damallsvenskan players
Women's association football midfielders